Harald Enevoldsen (27 January 1911 – 2005), was a Danish chess player, and Danish Chess Championship silver medalist (1951).

Biography
In the 1950s Harald Enevoldsen was one of the strongest Danish chess players. In 1951, in Danish Chess Championships he shared 1st place with Eigil Pedersen but lost additional match for champion's title.

Harald Enevoldsen played for Denmark in the Chess Olympiads:
 In 1952, at first reserve board in the 10th Chess Olympiad in Helsinki (+2, =2, -6),
 In 1954, at first reserve board in the 11th Chess Olympiad in Amsterdam (+2, =4, -3),
 In 1958, at second reserve board in the 13th Chess Olympiad in Munich (+2, =3, -2).

References

External links

Harald Enevoldsen chess games at 365chess.com

1911 births
2005 deaths
Sportspeople from Aalborg
Danish chess players
Chess Olympiad competitors
20th-century chess players